Shazia or Şaziye (Turkish) is a female given name that may refer to:

 Shazia Khalid (born 1973), Pakistani medical doctor and advocate of women's human rights
 Shazia Manzoor (active from 1992), singer from Rawalpindi
 Shazia Marri (born 1972), Pakistani politician and provincial Minister for Information of Sindh
 Shazia Mirza (active from 2000), British comedian and columnist 
 Shazia Tariq (born 1983), Pakistani politician
 Shazia, character from the UK TV show, Citizen Khan
 Shazia Khan, character from the 2019 film Blinded by the Light
 Şaziye Erdoğan (born 1992), Turkish female weightlifter 
 Şaziye İvegin (born 1982), Turkish female basketball player
 Şaziye Moral (1903–1985), Turkish stage, film and voice actress

.